The Mailiao Refinery is an oil refinery complex in Mailiao Township, Yunlin County, Taiwan.

History
The refinery began its first phase of production in 2000 with a capacity of 150,000 barrels per day. In 2002, it reached its full capacity at 450,000 barrels per day.

Architecture
The refinery consists of 28 storage tanks for crude oil with an individual capacity of 130,000 m3.

Incidents
 On 6 September 2011, a fire broke out at Formosa Petrochemical's No. 3 refinery plant. The fire started because of a leakage during the start of an alkylation unit at the plant but was put out within 30 minutes.
 On 15 July 2020, a fire broke out at No. 2 residual desulphurization unit.

See also
 List of oil refineries
 Mining in Taiwan

References

2000 establishments in Taiwan
Buildings and structures in Yunlin County
Energy infrastructure completed in 2000
Formosa Plastics Group
Oil refineries in Taiwan